The Erzgebirge (German: Erzgebirgsziege) is a breed of goat native to the Saxony region of Germany. Erzgebirge goats are polled, and have a reddish-brown coat with black stripes on the face, back, and legs. Primarily used for milking, the breed is critically endangered.

See also
 List of goat breeds 
 Thuringian goat

References

Goat breeds
Dairy goat breeds
Goat breeds originating in Germany